The Copperton Historic District is a historic district in  Copperton, Utah, United States, that is listed on the  National Register of Historic Places (NRHP).

Description

It is roughly bounded by State Highway (Utah State Route 209, formerly Utah State Route 48), Apex Road (formerly 5th East), Hillcrest Street, and Dinkyville Way (formerly 2nd West).

The district includes most of the historic town of Copperton, which was an isolated community at the mouth of Bingham Canyon, built mostly during 1926 to 1941 to house employees of the Utah Copper Company. The Copperton Community Methodist Church, which is also listed on the NRHP, is located just south of (outside) the boundaries of the historic district.

It includes Bungalow/craftsman, Tudor Revival, Spanish Colonial Revival, and vernacular architecture.

The district was listed on the NRHP on August 14, 1986

See also

 National Register of Historic Places listings in Salt Lake County, Utah

References

External links

National Register of Historic Places in Salt Lake County, Utah
Tudor Revival architecture in the United States
Buildings and structures completed in 1926